Shabanbay Bi, until 1996 Shylym (Шылым), is a village in Aktogay District, Karaganda Region, Kazakhstan. It is the administrative center of the Shabanbay Bi Rural District (KATO code - 353677100). Population:

Geography  
Mount Aksoran, the highest point of the Kazakh Uplands (Saryarka), rises  to the east, in the Kyzylarai massif.

References

Populated places in Karaganda Region

kk:Шабанбай би